The British Diving Championships - synchronised 10 metre platform winners are listed below.

The championships were not held in 2021 due to the COVID-19 pandemic.

synchronised 10 metre platform champions

References

Diving in the United Kingdom